Neuse Christian Academy (NCA), formerly known as Neuse Baptist Christian School, is a private, Christian, coeducational, primary and secondary day school located in Raleigh, North Carolina,  United States. Also simply known as Neuse, the school seeks to educate students in a traditional Christian environment.

Christian schools in North Carolina
Private schools in Raleigh, North Carolina
Private high schools in North Carolina
Private middle schools in North Carolina
Private elementary schools in North Carolina